Daṇḍa (literally 'stick', 'staff', or 'rod', an ancient symbol of authority) is the Hindu term for punishment. In ancient India, punishments were generally sanctioned by the ruler, but other legal officials could also play a part. The punishments that were handed out were in response to criminal activity. In the Hindu law tradition, there is a counterpart to daṇḍa which is prāyaścitta, or atonement. Where as daṇḍa is sanctioned primarily by the king, prāyaścitta is taken up by a person upon his or her own volition. Furthermore, daṇḍa provides a way for an offender to right any violations of dharma that he or she may have committed. In essence, daṇḍa functions as the ruler's tool to protect the system of life stages and castes. Daṇḍa makes up a part of vyavahāra, or legal procedure, which was also a responsibility afforded to the king.

Purpose of punishment
There were two main purposes for punishment in Hindu society. Incapacitation was the first purpose and was used to ensure that an offender would not be able to commit the same crime again. For example, the hands of a thief would be cut off. Deterrence was the second purpose of punishment. Criminals were punished to set an example to the public, in hopes of preventing future offenses. Although these were the two main purposes of Hindu Law, other purposes such as rehabilitation were used as means of punishment and correction. Retribution is another theory of punishment; however, it does not have a prevalent role in Hindu punishment.

Incapacitation
Incapacitation is a way to prevent the commission of a crime. An offender punished with death, banishment, imprisonment or mutilation prevents them from being able to repeat an offense permanently or temporarily. Many urge the king to cut off the offending limb of a thief to prevent them from stealing again. In the case of cutting off a limb, it has both a preventative effect and ensures that the same crime will not be committed again.

Deterrence
One reason for punishment is to prevent or discourage commission of crimes or unlawful behavior through deterrence. It can prevent people from committing a crime or from re-offending. According to the Mahabharata, people only engage in their lawful activities for fear of punishment by the king, in the afterlife, or from others. The main way to deter potential criminals from committing a crime was through the example of offenders suffering. Manu recommends the king place prisons near a high road where the "suffering and disfigured" offenders can be clearly seen, making imprisonment both deterrent and preventative.

Rehabilitation
Rehabilitation is yet another  goal of Hindu punishment. Someone who breaks the law should be punished in a way that improves his character and conduct and places the offender on the correct path. The Mahabharata recommends the king reform or correct criminals by punishment.

The Punishments
The King played a major role in the punishment of his subjects and his duty is discussed in the Manusmrti (Code of Manu). Manu says the duty of the King is to render those likely to compromise the public order, unable to do so. The only way for the King to maintain the order is with punishment. It is the sole object allowing the King to perform his function and daṇḍa was created in the interest of the King to worsen his subjects (M., VII. 27-29). A common theme, "the logic of the fish", illustrates this idea well.  Without a King to maintain order, the big fish would devour the little fish and it is through the King's punishment that the state is maintained.

There is no complete list of what is punishable and to what extent, but the King has the full discretion to decide it. Manu recommends that the King consider the circumstances of the crime and of the offender's ability to bear a specific penalty. The Dharmaśāstras say that because punishment is such a powerful tool it can't be delivered by the king without the advice of Brahmins; however, the King still has the ultimate decision. In the case of sins, Brahmins were in charge of delivering the penance, but often a sin constitutes a crime. According to Manu men who are punished by the King go to heaven like those who performed a good deed. There is much debate though on the way penance and punishment worked together.

Although the King could not make a decision without the advice of others, he was able to initiate investigations and administer punishment for certain criminal offenses. These offenses included violations of a ruler's decree or action against the state itself, according to the Nāradasmṛti. When there was a conflict within a corporate group that could not be resolved, the King was able to intervene and rectify the situation with administration of his own punishment. In the end the king was in charge of punishment and was designed to correct human vices and restrain them in order to lead them to a fulfilling life. Daṇḍa is what made it all possible.

Ancient texts vs. practice
The Dharmaśāstras are written texts that lay out rules dealing with dharma. They are essentially the legal texts of ancient Hindu society. These texts were written for the purpose of describing the ideal behavior of members in the society. The Dharmaśāstras were even written to encompass the method, by which, one would urinate or defecate. Another set of local laws that work in conjunction with Dharmaśāstras is ācāra. Dharmaśāstras date back to ancient India; however, there have been edits to the original texts over time. This is an indication that the authors of the texts knew that members of society were not following what had been written and decided to revise the original contents.

Circumstantial factors
In the Daṇḍaviveka, Vardhamāna outlines eleven factors affecting the severity of the punishment that will be meted out. "The caste (of the offender), the thing (involved in the offense), the quantity (of that thing), the utility (of that thing), the person, concerning who the offence  has been committed (parigrahaḥ), the age (of the offender), power (i.e., the pecuniary condition of the offender), qualifications (of the offender), the place (of the commission of the offense), the time (of such commission) and the specific offense are the several factors (to be considered, while inflicting punishment)." Every legal system considers mitigating factors; however, Hindu jurisprudence differs from most. From the beginning of a case, Hindu jurisprudence views each case as a sum of all of the factors. Therefore, all textually stated punishments are affected by the factors of a given case.

Types of punishment
In his digest, the Mānava-Dharmaśāstra, Manu cites four types of punishment: Vak-danda, admonition; Dhikdanda, censure; Dhanadanda, fine (penalty); and Badhadanda, physical punishments. Vak-danda is the least severe type of punishment and the severity increases as one examines Dhikdanda, Dhanadanda, and Badhadanda respectively. Manu also states that the different types of punishments may be combined to serve as a just punishment. Later authors added two more types of punishment: confiscation of property and public humiliation.

Admonition and censure

If forgiveness is not possible or desirable, it is seen whether the circumstances of the offense are deserving of admonition. Admonition is to be used first, and then censure. Both admonition and censure are the lowest and least severe of the possible punishments because neither inflict physical pain or loss of property. When using censure, "a good man committing his first offense should be asked: 'Is this your evil action.' 'Is it proper of you?'" Censure is a stronger disapproval than admonition.

Fines
A fine is to be imposed when damage is done to another; the amount of the fine is dependent on many factors. In the ancient Hindu tradition, it was generally accepted that if a Kshatriya, a Vaishya, or a Shudra was not able to repay the fine, then the offender was made to perform manual labor. However, it was expected that Brahmins would pay the fine in installments. The last resort was to imprison the offender if the offender could not perform manual labor. Presently, any offender may repay the fine in installments, but there cannot be more than three planned installments. According to the ancient Indians, the King must pay a heftier fine for committing a crime. This was thought because he was the prosecutor of his subjects, and therefore, he was also an example for his subjects. In accordance with this idea, the King was made to pay 1,000 Karshapanas when a common man would be fined just one Karshapana.

Fines for first offenders
There were conflicting views on how fines should be imposed on first-time offenders: either inflict lenient fines or very heavy fines to prevent the offender from becoming a recidivist. Over time, it became commonplace to base the amount of the fine on the nature of the crime. In totality, the nature of the crime, the ability of the offender to pay, whether or not it was the first offense, and whether it had been an individual or group that committed the crime were used to determine the amount of the fine. It was thought that an individual should have a lesser amount imposed upon him because he did not conspire to commit the crime with others.

Fines and caste
The amount of fine varied according to the caste in which one belonged. A Shudra would pay eight times the amount of the damage, a Vaishya would pay sixteen times the amount, and a Kshatriya would pay thirty-two times the amount. A Brahmin would generally pay sixty-four times the amount; however, a Brahmin could be made to pay up to a hundred times the amount of damage. The multiplier was different for each caste, because the mental capacity of the offender and the offender's ability to pay the fine were taken into consideration.

Fines due to the complainant
"If a blow was struck against men and animals in order to give them pain, the Judge had to inflict a fine in proportion to the amount of pain caused. If a limb was broken or wound caused, or blood flowed the assailant had to pay to the sufferer the expenses of the cure, or the whole (both the usual amercement and  the expenses of the cure) as a fine to the King. He who damaged the goods of another, intentionally or unintentionally had to give satisfaction to the owner, and pay to the King a fine equal to the damage." Here it is demonstrated that the offender must be fined proportionate to damage done, as well as, repay the victim. There were also heftier fines placed on certain items such as leather, utensils made from wood or clay, flowers, roots and fruits. The fines placed on these were five times the value of the item damaged.

Fines imposed on relatives
If there is a connection between the offender and the victim, the fine could be lesser than if no connection exists. This connection could be one of four types: between master and servant, between people having mutual dealings, between people from the same village, or between kinsmen. "Thus if a kinsman sold the owner's property the former was only to be fined 600 panas, but if he was not a kinsman, nor had any excuse he would be guilty of theft.

Imprisonment
The main function of imprisonment, for ancient Indians, was deterrence. Prisons were to be situated near main roads where the offenders could easily be seen. The Dharmaśāstras do not lay out specific crimes for which imprisonment is required; moreover, the Dharmaśāstras do not state how long a prisoner should be kept. It was left to the King to decide who would be imprisoned and for how long. The people who received stolen property "had to be put in iron fetters, kept on a lean diet, and made to do manual labour for the King till their death." Brahmins could be sent to prison if one had committed a crime that required mutilation; however, the Brahmin would not be forced to perform manual labor. The Brahmin could be made to do menial labors instead such as cleaning dirty dishes.

Mutilation
Mutilation of body parts is a remnant of the ancient Hindu punishment. It was used when an offender caused injuries to the victim. Mutilation was seen most typically as a punishment in cases of theft, robbery, and adultery as a way of making the criminal an example to the public because the mutilated body was a horrifying sight. Typically, whatever limb was used by the person of the lower caste to hurt a man of a higher caste would be cut off. Mutilation was also used to deter the offender from repeating the crime. Therefore, by cutting off the limb that was used to commit a crime, for example, stealing cows belonging to a Brahmin resulted in the offender losing half his feet, the offender would physically be unable to commit such crimes again. Lastly, there were eight main places of mutilation: the organ, the belly, the tongue, the hands, the feet, the eye, the nose, and the ears.

Death
Under the Indian Penal Code, the death penalty is reserved for the gravest offenses. There are only several crimes, for which inflicting death upon the criminal, is permissible. The first of which is waging war against the Government of India. The next action, which is punishable by death, is the encouragement of a mutiny which is committed in consequence thereof. The death penalty is also prescribed when someone gives false evidence that results in the defendant being convicted of the crime, sentenced to death and the punishment being carried out. The fourth reason someone can be sentenced to death is murder, under the notion of an eye for an eye. Again, the death penalty is allowed for someone who encourages the suicide of a minor, someone who is insane or a person who is intoxicated. The sixth reason a person can be sentenced to death is if a convict attempts to commit murder and harm is caused. The last reason the death penalty can be inflicted is if murder is committed during a robbery by a gang. All of the cases, in which one can be sentenced to death, are those in which death has resulted or was likely to result. For all seven of these cases, there is the alternative of lifetime imprisonment. Today, attempts are made to find mitigating and extenuating factors so that the lesser punishment is inflicted. It was commanded that the King should avoid capital punishment and instead detain, imprison and repress offenders.

There are some main differences between the ancient and the modern Indian law with respect to the death penalty. The first difference is that in classical India the death penalty was permissible in a very large number of cases. Second, the death penalty was not prescribed solely in cases in which death resulted or was likely to result. Instead, it was also used in cases such as adultery and theft. Third, there were numerous ways to inflict the death penalty, unlike modern India which uses hanging as their only means of imposing death. Fourth, in modern India the death penalty is an exception whereas in ancient India it was a rule. Fifth, today the underlying principle seems to be retributive while in classical India it was a means of deterrence. Lastly, today the law in relation to the death penalty is the same regardless of caste or color. However, in ancient India Brahmins were never subject to the death penalty.

Other forms of punishment

Whipping
Whipping was done with a whip, cane, rope, or something similar. Whipping was performed upon women, children, men of unsound mind, the impoverished, and the sick. Whipping, and the other forms of corporal punishment, would only be inflicted if the other three forms of punishment (admonition, censure, and fine) had failed to reform the offender.

Branding
Branding was often reserved for Brahmins who had committed one of four acts: the murder of another Brahmin, incest, one who had stolen gold, and one who had drunk wine. If one had killed another Brahmin, he would receive the brand of a human trunk on his forehead. For a Brahmin who committed incest, he would receive the brand of a female organ on his forehead. The Brahmin, who stole gold, would have the brand of a dog's foot on his forehead. Finally, the Brahmin, who had drunk wine, would bear the brand of a banner on his forehead. After being branded, the Brahmin would be made an outcast of his own country, and he would not be welcomed anywhere else due to the brand on his forehead. For all four castes, branding could be avoided if the offender performed the proper prāyaścitta. Men of other castes could be branded if they had an affair with the wife of another; after, the offender would be banished as well.

Banishment
As indicated in the section on branding, one who had been punished by being branded would be banished from his particular community. The idea of banishment after being branded probably originated with the King. No respectable king would want to have offenders displaying such brands in his Kingdom. Besides being banished concurrently with branding, there were various other crimes that one could commit which would warrant being banished. For one, who is a Shudra, Vaishya, or Kshatriya, that gave false evidence would be fined and banished; however, a Brahmin, who committed the same crime, would only be banished. If a man, who belonged to a corporation situated in a village, broke an agreement due to greed, his punishment would be banishment. The Dharmaśāstras also proscribe breaking the bone of another, gambling, "...dancers, and singers, cruel men, men belonging to an heretical sect, those following forbidden occupations, and sellers of spirituous liquor" lest one should be banished. If one was to intentionally commit a crime, he would be banished as well. If one, who was able, was to sit idly by as a "village is being plundered, a dyke is being destroyed, or a highway robbery committed," he would be banished with his belongings. For those who damaged a town wall, broke a town gate, or filled a ditch near town would instantly be banished. For a lower caste man, who through deceit, survived by working in an occupation, belonging to one of a higher caste, the King ought to confiscate property and banish the lower caste man. A defendant, who had lost and denied the due owed, was to be banished. People who cheated others, took bribes, or gave wrong judgments, if they were assessors, would also be banished. Visṇu and Nārada outline that those who hypnotize others or play foul should be branded and banished.

Confiscation of property
In ancient Hindu society, the entire private property of an offender would be confiscated, as opposed to, present day where the Indian Penal Codes only confiscate the property used in the commission of the crime. In ancient India, there were seven kinds of crimes that warranted confiscation of property. The first crime was for an official, who accepted money from suitors, with poor intentions. A Shudra who had intercourse with a woman of a higher caste was another crime that warranted confiscation of property. The property of a Vaishya could be taken if he were to have intercourse with a Brahmin. A trader, who exported goods that the King had a monopoly over or exporting an item that is forbidden, could have his property taken. The furniture of a woman, who disrespected her husband who is a drunkard or diseased, could be taken. An official, who is supposed to administer public affairs, but is also corrupted by wealth and has disrupted the business of another could have property taken. The entire property of a person, who is not a Brahmin, could be taken if that person had unintentionally committed a crime.

Progression of Daṇḍa over time
There are some very notable differences between the way ancient punishment was to be administered and how modern punishment is administered in Hindu societies. If a criminal were to confess to a crime, he would receive half of the prescribed punishment in ancient India; however in modern India, confessing does not mitigate one's punishment. In ancient India, one's caste would affect the punishment that he would receive. In modern India, caste does not play a role, which furthers the idea of equality among men. Modern law, in India, dictates that only laws that have been conceived and that are written down may be punished. In ancient Indian law, a person could be prosecuted for a crime that has not been written down if a Sishta, a Brahmin who had studied the Veda, declares the act to be a crime. One other punishment that could be incurred in ancient India was the confiscation of a Shudra's wife if he had an affair with a woman of a higher caste, which would be inconceivable in modern India.

Varnas and punishment
In ancient India, the nature of punishment varies with the varna (varna and caste are not synonymous) of the offender and offended. As a general rule when a person of a higher varna inflicts injury on another of a lower varna, the punishment is less severe than when a person of a lower varna inflicts injury on another of a higher varna. Therefore, the highest varna, Brahmins, were the most favorably situated and the Shudra varna, the lowest varna, least favorably situated.

The criminal law is not always so discriminatory. Many crimes have the same or similar punishment prescribed irrespective of the varna of the offender. An exception is the Brahmin class, being exempt from corporal punishment even in severe cases. Instead Brahmins were banished from the community and branded. In the case of theft, robbery, cheating, murder and treason, there was little distinction in punishment between non-Brahmins. The distinction between punishment for the Kshatriyas and the Vaishyas, was slight. Usually, the severity of punishment then was the most severe for the Shudra caste and progressively less as you went up the castes. But in some cases higher varna also received punishment higher than Shudra varna.

Other punishing authorities
Aside from the king, there are two other locations of law: the Brahmins/other community leaders and corporate groups. During the 17th and 18th centuries, a network of Brahmins dealt with disagreements related to the Brahmin community. In most cases, these councils had some relationship with the king, but yet were still able to remain autonomous as well. Rather than dealing primarily with disagreements that were already underway, the Brahmin institutions worked with questions about the law itself. A learned Brahmin is said to have knowledge about the Dharmaśāstras and therefore they "represented the living translation of Dharmaśāstra principles into real world legal matters..."

However, their power was not limited to resolving disputes solely within the Brahmin community. Brahmins also provided legal guidance to other communities and became a model for corporate governance. Corporate groups in ancient India included villages, castes, military associations, among many others. These individual groups produced laws for their members and the group to which one belonged was essentially predetermined by birth. What is seen from the historical records of legal practice in ancient India is that the lawmaking activities of numerous corporate groups was quite prevalent. These groups are the ones that "made Hindu law the law..." Overall, because corporate groups and Brahmin counsels were localized, ācāra became the main component behind their individual legal punishments. In the Yājñavalkya Smṛti, Vijñāneśvara states that ācāra has as much authority as the Dharmaśāstras. Supplementary to ācāra and the Dharmaśāstras, the bhāșyas, texts describing judicial procedure, described how the rules made from corporate groups should be made, how the ruler should use and interact with the laws, and how punishments should be meted out. However, there is a conflict between the authority of the Dharmaśāstras  and ācāra. The former has the support of the Veda; whereas, the latter is customary law. In order to resolve this conflict, the concept of paribhāșa was introduced. These supplemental rules provide interpretation of Dharmaśāstras and ācāra, as well as, removing conflicts between the two. The Dharmaśāstras became a more theoretical approach to law; whereas, ācāra became a more practical approach to law. Violation of ācāra would also be what would necessitate legal penalties.

Karma
One's karma is the good or bad that was performed in their previous life. Many writers on Hindu law believe that karmic retribution plays a major role in someone's next life. How a human is in this life, for example, their gender or caste, is a reflection of their actions in both their previous life and their current life. Penance is the only way to evade bodily marking that is a consequence of sin. It is through this ideology that we find a "naturalistic dimension also to the working of the criminal justice system." Mutilation of body parts is an action of the state as a form a punishment. Therefore, just like people can know someone's past sins by whether they are born blind or with some disease, it is also known that someone was punished by the state if they are missing a limb, for example. Overall, the criminal body and sinful body are similar in that they both carry the outward manifestations of one's disobedience of the criminal or moral law and bare the stigma of their corrupt state and status.  There are other authors who think of karma as unimportant in relation to daṇḍa. One reason for this thinking is because karma is impersonal and is not inflicted by an agent; whereas, daṇḍa has the King or some other official giving the punishment. Another reason for thinking of karma as unimportant is because it is barely mentioned in texts dealing with punishment. The Daṇḍaviveka, a treatise about punishment, contains very little discussion of karma.

See also
Monarchy in ancient India
Raja

Notes

References
Das Gupta, Ramaprasad. Crime and Punishment in Ancient India. Calcutta: Book, 1930. Print.
Davis, Donald R. "Centres of Law: Duties, Rights, and Jurisdictional Pluralism in Medieval India." In Legalism: Anthropology and History. Eds. P. Dresch and H. Skoda. Oxford University Press, forthcoming.
Davis, Donald R. "Intermediate Realms of Law: Corporate Groups and Rulers in Medieval India." 92-117. Print.
Davis, Donald R. The Spirit of Hindu Law. Cambridge [U.K.]: Cambridge UP, 2010. Print.
Doongaji, Damayanti. Crime and Punishment in Ancient Hindu Society. Delhi: Ajanta Publications, 1986. Print.
Lāhiṛī, Tārāpada. Crime and Punishment in Ancient India. New Delhi: Radiant, 1986. Print.
Lariviere, Richard W. "Law and Religion in India." Law, Morality, and Religion: Global Perspectives. Berkeley: University of California, 1996. 75-94. Print.
Lingat, Robert. The Classical Law of India. Berkeley: University of California, 1973. Print.
Olivelle, Patrick. "Penance and Punishment: Marking the Body in Criminal Law and Social Ideology of Ancient India." The Journal of Hindu Studies 4 (2011): 23-41. Web.
Sarkar, Benoy K. "The Hindu Theory of the State." Political Science Quarterly 36.1 (1921): 79-90. JSTOR. The Academy of Political Science. Web. 8 May 2012. <https://www.jstor.org/stable/2142662>.

Hindu law
Ancient Indian law
Punishments in religion